Crawford Baptie (born 24 February 1959 in Glasgow) is a Scottish former footballer.

During his playing career, Baptie played junior football for Baillieston Juniors, before moving onto the professional game with Falkirk, Motherwell, Hamilton Academical, Clyde and Stenhousemuir. After retiring as a player, Baptie became the general manager at Falkirk.

References

External links

1959 births
Living people
Footballers from Glasgow
Scottish footballers
Association football defenders
Association football forwards
Baillieston Juniors F.C. players
Falkirk F.C. players
Motherwell F.C. players
Hamilton Academical F.C. players
Clyde F.C. players
Stenhousemuir F.C. players
Scottish Junior Football Association players
Scottish Football League players